Harry Joseph Thacker (born 18 February 1994) is an English rugby union player who plays for Bristol Bears in Premiership Rugby. He plays as a hooker.  Thacker made 70 appearances for Leicester Tigers between 2013–2018.  

Thacker is the son of former Tigers hooker Troy Thacker. He has a younger brother, Charlie, who was in the Tigers development squad, and now plays for Nottingham in the RFU Championship.

On 20 January 2018, Thacker agreed to leave Leicester to join Bristol ahead of the 2018–19 season.

References

External links 
 Leicester Tigers profile

1994 births
Living people
Rugby union players from Leicester
Rugby union hookers
English rugby union players
People educated at Leicester Grammar School
Leicester Tigers players
Bristol Bears players